Verlin Talmadge Adams (July 14, 1918 – April 30, 1985) was a professional American football player in the National Football League. Born in Burnwell, Kentucky, he played college football for the University of Charleston in Charleston, West Virginia. Adams was drafted by the New York Giants in the 31st round (291st overall) of the 1943 NFL Draft. He played for the Giants from 1943 to 1945.  Adams played as a tackle and wore number 28.

References

1918 births
1985 deaths
People from Pike County, Kentucky
Players of American football from Kentucky
Charleston Golden Eagles football players
New York Giants players